Lyracappul is a mountain in Limerick in Ireland. At a height of 825 metres (2,707 ft) it is the second highest of the Galtee Mountains and the 29th highest peak in Ireland.  Lyracappul is the second highest point in County Limerick.

See also
Lists of mountains in Ireland
List of mountains of the British Isles by height
List of Marilyns in the British Isles
List of Hewitt mountains in England, Wales and Ireland

References

External links
Lyracappul

Geography of County Limerick
Mountains and hills of County Limerick
Mountains under 1000 metres